Kutiyattam is the only surviving specimen of the ancient Sanskrit theatre, thought to have originated around the beginning of the Common Era, and is officially recognised by UNESCO as a Masterpiece of the Oral and Intangible Heritage of Humanity. In addition, many forms of Indian folk theatre abound. They are listed below.

References

Traditional
Theatre
Traditional theatre
India